Ion Tripşa (30 March 1934 – 2001) was a Romanian sport shooter who competed in the 1964 Summer Olympics and in the 1972 Summer Olympics. He won a silver medal in the rapid fire pistol event at the 1964 Summer Olympics.

He also won team silver medals in the 25 metre rapid fire pistol at the Wiesbaden World Championships in 1966 and at the 1970 World Championships in Phoenix, USA.

References

1934 births
2001 deaths
Romanian male sport shooters
ISSF pistol shooters
Olympic shooters of Romania
Shooters at the 1964 Summer Olympics
Shooters at the 1972 Summer Olympics
Olympic silver medalists for Romania
Olympic medalists in shooting
Medalists at the 1964 Summer Olympics
Sportspeople from Alba Iulia